Afanasenko (Ukrainian: Афанасенко) is a Ukrainian surname. Notable people with the surname include:
 Alexei Afanasenko (1925-1972), full Cavalier of the Order of Glory
 Ivan Afanasenko (1923-1975), a Hero of the Soviet Union
 Yury Afanasenko (1973-), a Belarusian professional football coach

See also
 

Ukrainian-language surnames